The Comité Revoluzonareo Arredista Galego (CRAG, Galician Revolutionary Secesionist Committee in English language) was a Galician political organization founded by a group of Havana emigrated Galicians, led by Fuco Gómez in 1921. The organization advocated for the independence of Galiza, and therefore is considered the first galician independentist group. It was a group of semi-clandestine character. On 25 July 1922, the CRAG issued the statement Independenza ou morte. Later the organization wrote up a constitution project for Galiza, designed a flag, anthem and coat of arms for the Republic of Galicia. During the Second Spanish Republic its political activity was irrelevant.

References

1921 establishments in Spain
Defunct nationalist parties in Spain
Defunct political parties in Galicia (Spain)
Galician nationalist parties
Political parties established in 1921
Political parties with year of disestablishment missing
Republican parties in Spain
Secessionist organizations in Europe